The Kohler Alpha is an American, mid-wing, V-tailed, FAI Open Class single seat glider that was designed and built by Spud Kohler of Cleveland, Ohio.

Design and development
Kohler built the Alpha in 1965 as a development of the Schreder Airmate HP-11. He used the wings from the HP-11 and combined this with a newly designed fuselage and tail. Kohler expressed the opinion that a sailplane's performance is mostly determined by its wing, while the fuselage imparts character to the design. The fuselage that he designed must have contributed to the performance, though, as the Alpha has a glide ratio  two points higher than the HP-11 with the same wing.

The Alpha fuselage is made from wood, with some fiberglass components incorporated. The fuselage uses a circular cross-section from nose to tail, with the diameter varying from the  diameter at the tail to a  diameter at the cockpit. The HP-11 wing is of all-metal and features a 26:1 aspect ratio, a  wingspan and a NACA 65 (3)-618 airfoil. The v-tail is removable by first removing the tailcone and then withdrawing two pins. The controls are adapted from a Piper PA-24 Comanche. The landing gear is a retractable monowheel and a tail skid. The tail skid was later replaced with a tail wheel.

Operational history
The Alpha had a number of owners and, according to Federal Aviation Administration registry records was most recently transferred to the Jimmy Doolittle Air & Space Museum at Travis Air Force Base, in Solano County, California. The museum does not currently indicate the aircraft is part of their collection, nor is it on display.

Specifications (Alpha)

See also

References

1960s United States sailplanes
Homebuilt aircraft
Aircraft first flown in 1965
V-tail aircraft
High-wing aircraft